The 2000 ITF Men's Circuit was the 2000 edition of the third tier tour for men's professional tennis. In 2000 there were 39 Satellite Circuits for men in 21 countries and 249 Futures tournaments for men in 55 countries. Each Satellite Circuit and Futures tournament was organised and run by the National Association of the country in which the event took place.

ITF Satellite circuits
Each Satellite Circuit comprises three tournaments plus a Masters playoff at which prize money and ranking points are awarded. 
Below are listed the winners of each Satellite Circuit, with the ATP Tour ranking points won (based on the total number of circuit points during the tour weeks).

Circuits
{|
|-valign=top
|

January–March

April–June

July–October

ITF Futures 
Single-week Futures tournaments were played for the third time in 2000, having been established in 1998.

Point distribution

Events

{|
|-valign=top
|

January

February

March

April

May

June

July

August

September

October

November

December

References

External links
International Tennis Federation official website
ITF Futures tournaments

2000
ITF Men's Circuit